The Marion County School District is a public school district in Marion County, Georgia, United States, based in Buena Vista. It serves the communities of Buena Vista, Juniper, Mauk, Tazewell, and Oakland.

Schools
The Marion County School District has one elementary school and one middle/high school.

Elementary school
L. K. Moss Primary School

High school
Marion County High School

References

External links

School districts in Georgia (U.S. state)
Education in Marion County, Georgia